Tedrow Glacier is a tributary Glacier which flows north into Ferrar Glacier along the west side of Table Mountain, in Victoria Land. Named by the Advisory Committee on Antarctic Names (US-ACAN) for John C. F. Tedrow, United States Antarctic Research Program (USARP) project leader for soil studies, who worked at McMurdo Station, 1961–62.

Glaciers of Scott Coast